Gnathophis longicauda, the little conger, little conger eel or silver conger, is an eel in the family Congridae (conger/garden eels). It was described by Edward Pierson Ramsay and James Douglas Ogilby in 1888, originally under the genus Congromuraena. It is a marine, temperate water-dwelling eel which is endemic to Australia, in the Indo-West Pacific. It dwells at a depth range of 2–99 metres, and inhabits the continental shelf and slope.

References

longicauda
Fish described in 1888